Belmont Park Racecourse is one of the two major horse racing venues within the Perth, Western Australia metropolitan area, the other being Ascot Racecourse, and is located just outside of the central business district on the Burswood Peninsula surrounded by the Swan River. Belmont is Perth's winter racecourse, with fully enclosed facilities for spectators.

On 24 December 1910 Belmont Park held its first harness race meeting, conducted by the Western Australian Trotting Association (WATA). The WATA continued to conduct race meetings on a fortnightly basis, using both Belmont Park and the Claremont Showground as venues, until the harness racing commenced on the WACA Ground track, on 28 June 1913.

In January 1911 the first aeroplane flight in Western Australia was conducted from the Belmont Park Racecourse. The racecourse served as Perth's first regular landing area until a more suitable site was found at Langley Park in 1919.

Races

The following is a list of Group races which are run at Belmont Park Racecourse.

References

Further reading
 
 
 

Sports venues in Perth, Western Australia
Horse racing venues in Australia
Burswood, Western Australia
Sports venues completed in 1910